Dame Kathryn Mary Thirlwall, DBE (born 21 November 1957), styled The Rt Hon Lady Justice Thirlwall, is an English judge of the Court of Appeal, and since December 2019 is the Senior Presiding Judge for England and Wales.  She practised as a barrister from 1982, was a High Court judge from April 2010, and was promoted to the Court of Appeal of England and Wales in February 2017.

Thirlwall was educated at St Anthony's Girls' Catholic Academy in Sunderland, and at the University of Bristol, and studied for the Common Professional Examination at Newcastle Polytechnic.

She was called to the bar at Middle Temple in 1982. She specialised in local authority education and abuse litigation. She became a QC in 1999, and served on the Professional Standards Committee of the Bar Council from 1999 to 2005. She became head of chambers at 7 Bedford Row in 2006, and a bencher of Middle Temple in 2008.

Thirlwall was appointed as an assistant recorder in 1998 and then as a recorder in 2000.  She was appointed as a High Court judge in April 2010, assigned to the Queen's Bench Division, and received the customary damehood.  She was Presiding Judge of the Midlands Circuit from 2011 to 2015.  She was promoted to the Court of Appeal of England and Wales in February 2017.

Personal life
She is married to Professor Charles Kelly; they have two adult children.

References

1957 births
Living people
Alumni of the University of Bristol
Alumni of Northumbria University
Members of the Middle Temple
Queen's Bench Division judges
British women judges
Dames Commander of the Order of the British Empire
Lady Justices of Appeal
Members of the Privy Council of the United Kingdom